Vladimir Ivanovich Kabakhidze (born 9 September 1999) is a Russian football player of Georgian descent who plays for FC Veles Moscow.

Club career
He appeared for PFC CSKA Moscow in the 2016–17 UEFA Youth League.

He made his debut in the Russian Premier League for FC Tambov on 21 June 2020 in a game against FC Ufa, replacing Vladimir Obukhov in the 56th minute.

References

External links
 
 
 

1999 births
Sportspeople from Krasnodar
Russian sportspeople of Georgian descent
Living people
Russian footballers
Association football midfielders
PFC CSKA Moscow players
FC Arsenal Tula players
FC Tambov players
FC Veles Moscow players
Russian Premier League players
Russian First League players